George Franklin Benson Jr. (February 26, 1929 – March 9, 2019) was an American jazz musician and educator.

Background 

Benson served in the United States Army during the Korean War, where he was stationed in Oahu. Benson later worked for the United States Postal Service.

As a session musician, Benson appeared on several Motown sessions in the 1960s, particularly with Marvin Gaye. In 1983, he recorded with J. C. Heard on Heard's first album as leader since 1958, with pianist Claude Black and Canadian bassist Dave Young. Benson co-led an album with Heard in 1988.

George was part of the Detroit jazz scene including the Austin Moro Big Band. He was a musical friend of trombonist Al Winters during that time, from the 1970s and on into the 1990s.

Benson died on March 9, 2019.

Discography
As leader/co-leader
The Key Player
1986: Detroit's George Benson Swings & Swings & Swings' (Parkwood)
1988: Mr. B. with J.C. Heard - Partners in Time (Blind Pig Records)
1998: Sax Master (Alembic Arts Label)

As sideman
1967: Temptations Live! - The Temptations
1970: The Earl of Funk - Earl Van Dyke (Soul Records)
1972: New McKinneys Cotton Pickers (Bountiful Label)
1978: Take a Look at Yourself - Eddie Russ (Monument Records)
1980: The Austin Moro Big Band (Locus Label)
1983: The Detroit Jazz Tradition - Alive & Well - JC Heard (Parkwood)
1988: Paradise Valley Ducts - Sammy Price (Parkwood)
1992: Live in Concert - Wendell Harrison
1994: Time Won't Stop - Alma Smith (Valma Music Company)
1997: Everybody's Favorite - B.B. Queen
1998: Unwind: Creative Healing - various artists
1998: Suite William - Bess Bonnier (Noteworks Label)The Matt Michaels Trio & Friends - Matt MichaelsThe Eyes of Youth - Dennis TiniLive at Sharaku - Miyoko HonmaA Time to Mourn, A Time to Dance - Chris CollinsParisian Protocol - Paul VornHagenSwing as You Are - Paul VornHagenExordium - Brad FeltA Monk and a Mingus Among Us - Donald WaldenJazzscapes - Sheila Landis

Publications
 Jazz Etudes Over Classic Jazz Changes'' (Houston Publishing)

References

External links
Official website

1929 births
2019 deaths
American jazz saxophonists
American male saxophonists
American male jazz musicians
21st-century American saxophonists
21st-century American male musicians
20th-century American saxophonists